Charlotta Öberg (1818, in Stockholm – 21 June 1856) known as Lotta Öberg, was a Swedish poet.

Born in poverty as the child of a lumberman and a cleaning woman. She was not able to work for a living because of her bad health. She educated herself by reading the school books of a neighbour's son. Her poems were read at the salon of a rich woman, for whom her mother worked, which made her discovered. She was placed in a pension by count Gustaf af Wetterstedt, and her career was financed by rich people.

Between 1834 and 1841, she published the collection Lyriska dikter (Lyrical Poems) which was given the assessment: They [her poems] give witness of a deep and warm emotion, which in a simple, innocent and touching way reminds of the tones from the great poets, from which she was inspired.  Her death was reported in the press.

Further reading

External links 
 Wilhelmina Stålberg: Anteqningar om svenska qvinnor (Notes on Swedish women)
 Project Runeberg : Svenskt biografiskt handlexikon  (1906)

1818 births
1856 deaths
Swedish-language writers
Swedish women poets
19th-century Swedish women writers
19th-century Swedish poets